Hisham Akira Bharoocha (born March 12, 1974 in Niigata, Japan) is an American musician and visual artist best known as an ex-member of the Providence bands Lightning Bolt and Black Dice. Currently, Bharoocha is involved in his band Soft Circle and works as an artist in New York City.

Biography

Early life
Hisham was born in Niigata, Japan, to a Japanese mother and Burmese father. As a newborn, the family moved to Tokyo and then to Toronto when he was two, then to Los Angeles when he was six, and spent the rest of his elementary school years in San Diego. Bharoocha's mother moved the family back to Tokyo after his father died of cancer. It was at this time he began to study the bass guitar and found an interest in heavy metal.  

After graduating from high school, Bharoocha attended the Rhode Island School of Design (RISD) in Providence, Rhode Island, where he studied various art forms such as video and photography.

Visual art
In addition to music, Hisham is also a visual artist and photographer. He has had solo exhibitions of his work at D'Amelio Terras gallery in New York, as well as Vleeshal, a state run space in The Netherlands. He has been in numerous group exhibitions at galleries such as Deitch Projects, John Connelly Presents and Yerba Buena Center for the Arts. His work has been published in Artforum, V, i-D, Flaunt, Tokion and more.

Music
At RISD, he met fellow musician Brian Gibson and soon became the vocalist in the band Lightning Bolt. This was short-lived, however, and Bharoocha eventually began playing as the drummer in a band that would eventually become Black Dice. The only officially released Lightning Bolt music with Bharoocha was a track on the Repopulation Program compilation. Hisham played in Black Dice until leaving the band in 2005.

Bharoocha moved to New York City upon graduating from RISD in 1998, where he became actively involved in the music and art scene. Since leaving Black Dice in 2005, he has released two albums as Soft Circle. The first album, "Full Bloom", was a solo endeavor. The following album "Shore Obsessed" was the first to include bandmate Ben Vida. Bharoocha also played drums for Pixeltan, who released several EPs on DFA records. 

Bharoocha served as musical director and participated as drummer 4 in the Boredoms 77 Boadrum performance which occurred on July 7, 2007 at the Empire–Fulton Ferry State Park in Brooklyn, New York. On 8/8/2008, Hisham again musically directed and performed in the 88 Boadrum, a duo of free concerts performed at La Brea Tar Pits in Los Angeles and the Williamsburg waterfront in Brooklyn, NY.  Each concert began at 8:08 PM local time and featured 88 drummers selected by Boredoms and Hisham Bharoocha, the concert's director. Boredoms themselves appeared in Los Angeles, with Gang Gang Dance conducted the Brooklyn concerts. The concert was composed by Japanese noise band the Boredoms, with Hisham as the project's artistic director.

In July 2009, Hisham released a split 12 inch with High Places on the label PPM.

In 2009, Ben Vida, formerly of Town & Country and currently of Singer & Birdshow, joined Soft Circle. A new album entitled "Shore Obsessed" was released November 6, 2010. 

Hisham collaborated with Sonic Youth's Kim Gordon, model Erin Wasson, No Age, Opening Ceremony, Maria Cornejo and United Bamboo on a line of sunglasses called Phosphorescence.

References

External links
 Hisham Bharoocha official website
 77 Boadrum Site Profile Viva Radio, Sep 2007.  (Flash)
 Vice Magazine Interview from 2008

1976 births
living people
Rhode Island School of Design alumni
Rhode Island School of Design alumni in music